Kalam is a village in Bakrabad Rural District, in the Central District of Varzaqan County, East Azerbaijan Province, Iran. At the 2006 census, its population was 47, in 10 families.

Kolm (or Kulm) is a village in Badreh District, Ilam Province, Iran.

References 

Towns and villages in Varzaqan County